Everybody Sunshine is the sixth studio album by American actor and singer David Hasselhoff, released on September 14, 1992 by White Records. The album features writing from Kristian Schultze, Peter Luedemann, Jerry Rix and The Gardeners. It was the last album produced by  Jack White, who collaborated with Hasselhoff since 1988. The album was not as successful as his previous efforts, reaching the top-twenty in Austria and Switzerland, and the top-thirty in Germany.

Background and release
Hasselhoff released three albums which became a huge success in Europe: Looking for Freedom (1989), Crazy for You (1990) and David (1991). Those albums were produced by German music producer Jack White. Everybody Sunshine became the last album to be produced by White, who collaborated with Hasselhoff since 1988, as he didn't write any song on the album. It also became Hasselhoff's last release under the White Records label, with his following albums being released by Ariola/BMG Records.

Promotion
Hasselhoff performed the album's title track for the first time at German TV show Wetten, dass..? on November 7, 1992.

Singles
The album's title track, which became the Official Song of the International Youth Games of 1993, peaked at numbers 26 and 27 in Austria and Switzerland, respectively. The second single, "The Girl Forever", only peaked at number 78 in Germany. The third single, "Darling I Love You", failed to chart.

Commercial performance
Everybody Sunshine failed to match the success of his previous release, which became a top-ten album in Europe, David (1991), as it failed to enter the top-ten in Austria, Germany and Switzerland. In Austria, the album peaked at number 16, spending 13 weeks on the chart. In Switzerland, the album peaked at number 17, spending only nine weeks on the chart. In Germany, the album peaked at number 21, spending 14 weeks on the German charts.

Though Everybody Sunshine was certified Gold in Austria, Germany and Switzerland, the album failed to reach the commercial heights of his three previous albums.

Track listing

Charts and certifications

Weekly charts

Certifications

References 

1992 albums
David Hasselhoff albums
Albums produced by Jack White (music producer)
Ariola Records albums